Cane cholla is a common name for several cacti and may refer to:

Cylindropuntia californica
Cylindropuntia imbricata, native to the southwestern United States and northern Mexico
Cylindropuntia spinosior